Xırdalan is a city, municipality and the capital of the Absheron District of Azerbaijan. It has a population of 95,200. Khyrdalan is home of country's biggest brewery Baltika Baku, previously known as Khyrdalan . A monument to Egyptian president Hosni Mubarak was erected in 2007 in the city. Similarly, a statue of Heydar Aliyev was erected in Cairo in 2008. In the wake of the 2011 Egyptian protests, the Azerbaijani opposition, led by the Musavat Party, demanded the demolition of the statue, calling it a "worship of idols". On 8 June 2011, the statue was taken down following Mubarak's resignation.

On 29 November 2006, the settlement gained city status after its approval by the National Assembly of Azerbaijan.

Notable natives 
 Nabi Khazri — poet, novelist and playwright, People's Poet of Azerbaijan SSR (1984).

References

External links
 

Populated places in Absheron District